The mixed team aerials competition in freestyle skiing at the 2022 Winter Olympics was held on 10 February, at the Genting Snow Park in Zhangjiakou. This was the first time a mixed team short freestyle skiing event is featured at the Olympics. The United States team, represented by Ashley Caldwell, Christopher Lillis, and Justin Schoenefeld, won the event. China with Xu Mengtao, Jia Zongyang, and Qi Guangpu won the silver medal, and Canada with Marion Thénault, Miha Fontaine, and Lewis Irving became the bronze medalist.

At the 2021–22 FIS Freestyle Ski World Cup, only two mixed team events were held before the Olympics. Both were won by China, with Russia and the United States ranked one time second, and Ukraine two times third. Russia were the 2021 world champion, and Switzerland and the United States were the silver and the bronze medalists, respectively.

Qualification

A total of up to 8 teams qualified to compete. Every country with at least three athletes qualified (with at least one man and one woman) can enter.

Results

References

Freestyle skiing at the 2022 Winter Olympics
Mixed events at the 2022 Winter Olympics